Ballygowan is an Irish brand of mineral water. It is bottled at Newcastle West in County Limerick, near its source at the site of a reputed holy well used by the Knights Templar. Ballygowan is the leading water brand in the Irish market.

The company was founded by Geoff Read in 1981, who launched a marketing and distribution joint venture in 1984 with Richard Nash, a soft drink manufacturer. Anheuser-Busch took a stake in 1987, which was bought back in 1989. In 1993, Ballygowan was bought by Cantrell and Cochrane (now C&C), which sold its non-alcoholic brands to Britvic in 2007. The 1993 deal involved Nash selling the source but retaining part of the source area, which it later used for its own rival spring water brand.

Products 
Ballygowan sell a range of bottled water products.

On the Go range 
The "On the Go" range includes:

 500ml still water
 500ml sparkling water
 750ml still water
 1L still water (sports bottle)

With a Hint of Fruit range 
The "With a Hint of Fruit" range includes 3 flavours:

 Strawberry
 Summer Fruits
 Mango and Passion Fruit

The range comes in both 750ml and 1.5L bottles

At Home range 
The "At Home" range is Ballygowan's larger bottles and multipack range and is sold in the following sizes:

 1.5L
 2L
 6 x 500ml
 6 x 1.5L

Glass Range 
This range is Ballygowan water sold in glass bottles and comes as:

 330ml still and sparkling 
 750ml still and sparkling

At Home and Workplace Range 
This range offers much larger sized bottles for your water cooler, these are available as follows:

 11L still
 18.9L still

References

Sources

Citations

External links
 www.ballygowan.ie Official website

Mineral water
Food and drink in Ireland